Zeballos Water Aerodrome  is located adjacent to Zeballos, British Columbia, Canada.

See also
 List of airports on Vancouver Island

References

Seaplane bases in British Columbia
Strathcona Regional District
Registered aerodromes in British Columbia